East Rajabazar is a mahallah (neighborhood) in Ward 40 of Tejgaon Thana, Dhaka city, Bangladesh. According to the 2011 Bangladesh census, it had 6,195 households and a population of 29,820.

References

Neighbourhoods in Bangladesh